Enquiring Minds is the debut solo studio album by American rapper Gangsta Boo. It was released on September 29, 1998 via Hypnotize Minds/Relativity Records. Recording sessions took place at Cotton Row Recording Studio in Memphis. Production was handled by DJ Paul and Juicy J.

Track listing

Chart history

References

External links

1998 debut albums
Gangsta Boo albums
Relativity Records albums
Albums produced by DJ Paul
Albums produced by Juicy J